Hietanen is a Finnish surname. Notable people with the surname include:

Helena Hietanen (born 1963), Finnish sculptor
Janne Hietanen (born 1978), Finnish footballer
Juha Hietanen (born 1955), Finnish ice hockey player
Juuso Hietanen (born 1985), Finnish ice hockey player
Konsta Hietanen (born 1984), Finnish footballer
Matti Hietanen (born 1983), Finnish volleyball player
Mika Hietanen (born 1968), Finnish cyclist
Mikko Hietanen (1911–1999), Finnish long-distance runner
Valtteri Hietanen (born 1992), Finnish ice hockey player
Yrjö Hietanen (1927–2011), Finnish sprint canoeist

See also
 Hietanen (Kotka), a port in Kotka and an island

Finnish-language surnames